Robert Lowry (March 10, 1829January 19, 1910) was an American politician and lawyer who served as the 32nd governor of Mississippi from 1882 to 1890. Before entering politics, he was a senior officer of the Confederate States Army who commanded infantry in the Western Theater of the American Civil War.

Early life and military service 

Robert Lowry was born in Chesterfield District, South Carolina on March 10, 1829, and was raised in Mississippi. During the American Civil War, he enlisted as a private in the Confederate States Army. He quickly received a commission in the 6th Mississippi Infantry. He commanded the regiment at the Battle of Shiloh, where it suffered very heavy casualties, and he was wounded. In early 1864, he led the troops that were sent to put down the local uprising of citizens near Jones County, Mississippi. Later, Lowry commanded a brigade of Mississippi regiments in the Third Corps, Army of Tennessee; in February 1865, he was finally promoted to brigadier-general. When the war was over, he returned to legal practice in Brandon. Lowry briefly served in the Mississippi State Senate after the war (1865–1866). Massive fraud in the gubernatorial election of 1881 resulted in the election of the subject over the Independent People's Party candidate, Benjamin King.

Governor (1882–1890) 
Between 1882 and 1890, he was the Democratic governor of Mississippi, serving two four-year terms. He could be called a Bourbon Democrat. The Farmers' Alliance movement continued to show local action in Yazoo County and most areas of the state.

In September 1889, Lowry ordered the state militia to Leflore County, where organized by the Colored Farmers' National Alliance and Cooperative Union sparked false rumors of an impending Black "uprising." Militia troops killed an estimated 25 Black people.

Political activity related to peonage and racial discrimination in the Mississippi delta and other areas of the state led to violence during his term of office. Rapid industrial development occurred during his administration as well as the founding of the first state-supported women's college at Columbus.

Personal life 
Lowry was related to J.A.W. Lowry, a lawyer and politician in Bossier Parish in northwestern Louisiana.

See also 
 List of Confederate States Army generals
 List of members of the United Confederate Veterans

References

Sources 
 Eicher, John H., and David J. Eicher, Civil War High Commands. Stanford: Stanford University Press, 2001. .
 Sifakis, Stewart. Who Was Who in the Civil War. New York: Facts On File, 1988. .
 Warner, Ezra J. Generals in Gray: Lives of the Confederate Commanders. Baton Rouge: Louisiana State University Press, 1959. .

External links 
 
 Robert Lowry at The Political Graveyard
 
 

1829 births
1910 deaths
19th-century American historians
19th-century American lawyers
19th-century American male writers
19th-century American merchants
19th-century American politicians
20th-century American historians
20th-century American male writers
American Civil War prisoners of war
American lawyers admitted to the practice of law by reading law
American male non-fiction writers
American slave owners
Burials in Mississippi
Businesspeople from Mississippi
Confederate States Army brigadier generals
Democratic Party governors of Mississippi
Historians from Mississippi
Military personnel from Mississippi
Mississippi lawyers
Democratic Party Mississippi state senators
People from Brandon, Mississippi
People from Chesterfield County, South Carolina
People from Smith County, Mississippi
People of Mississippi in the American Civil War
Writers from Jackson, Mississippi